The 1930 Bowling Green Falcons football team was an American football team that represented Bowling Green State College (later renamed Bowling Green State University) as a member of the Northwest Ohio League (NOL) during the 1930 college football season. In their seventh season under head coach Warren Steller, the Falcons compiled a 6–0–2 record (2–0–2 against NOL opponents), finished in second place out of five teams in the NOL, and outscored opponents by a total of 107 to 38. Chet Chapman was the team captain.

Schedule

References

Bowling Green
Bowling Green Falcons football seasons
Northwest Ohio League football champion seasons
College football undefeated seasons
Bowling Green Falcons football